To the Bone is the tenth solo album by Kris Kristofferson, released in 1981, his last for Monument Records.  It is his first album after his divorce from Rita Coolidge, and many of its songs deal with relationship decline.  "Nobody Loves Anybody Anymore" became a minor hit.

Background
In many respects, the release of To the Bone symbolized the end of an era for Kristofferson.  It would be the final album in his contract with Monument Records, which was nearly bankrupt, and in December he would divorce Rita Coolidge, with whom he recorded three duet albums.  Kristofferson also spent much of the period working on Heaven's Gate, an epic film that opened to disastrous reviews in November 1980, devastating his movie career. He toured with friend Willie Nelson in the winter of 1979-1980 in support of Nelson’s tribute LP Sings Kristofferson, which made the Top 5 and spawned the  hit single "Loving Her Was Easier (Than Anything I’ll Ever Do Again)".  The song would also just miss the top spot on the country charts in 1981 for Tompall Glaser and the Glaser Brothers, two more examples of artists having far more success with Kristofferson’s music than he himself was having.

Recording and composition
For his final Monument album, Norbert Putman replaced David Anderle in the production chair, only the third producer to work on Kristofferson’s solo albums since 1970, the other being Fred Foster.  Like Bob Dylan’s 1975 album Blood on the Tracks, To the Bone was a deeply personal album that explored the disillusion and heartache in the wake of a disintegrated relationship – specifically Kristofferson’s failed marriage with ex-wife Coolidge.   By all accounts, the ending had been a bitter one; Heaven’s Gate co-star Ronnie Hawkins remembers that while on the set "Rita had lawyers up there suing him – so he had to have meetings regarding all that stuff as well as all the other stuff that was going wrong in his life". In his assessment of the album, biographer Stephen Miller writes:

Having been disowned by his family when he turned his back on an army career to pursue songwriting in Nashville, Kristofferson was all too aware of the emotional pain that familial turmoil could bring, and he expressed these concerns in "Daddy’s Song", which was about the pain his separation with Rita was causing their daughter Casey.   The Billy Swan co-written "Nobody Loves Anybody Anymore", another song expressing bitterness and grief over lost love, would be a modestly successful single.

Reception
Despite its downbeat subject matter, To the Bone charted for several weeks, a better showing than his previous LP Shake Hands with the Devil, but it was not a commercial success.  Kristofferson would not release another studio album for six years.

Track listing
All songs composed by Kris Kristofferson; except as noted
"Magdalene" – 3:42
"Star-Crossed" – 3:29
"Blessing in Disguise" – 3:26
"Devil to Pay" (Merle Travis, Leon Rusk) – 3:23
"Daddy's Song" – 5:03
"Snakebit" – 3:32
"Nobody Loves Anybody Anymore" (Kristofferson, Billy Swan) – 3:08
"Maybe You Heard" – 2:59
"The Last Time" – 4:13
"I'll Take Any Chance I Can With You" (Kristofferson, Glen Clark) – 3:29

Personnel
Kris Kristofferson - vocals, guitar
Donnie Fritts - keyboards
Glen Clark - keyboards, backing vocals
Billy Swan - guitar, backing vocals
Stephen Bruton - guitar, backing vocals
Tommy McClure - bass
David Briggs - keyboards
Steve Gibson - guitar
Sammy Creason - drums

Production
Produced by Norbert Putnam 
Engineered by Gene Eichelberger 
Recorded at Caribou Ranch, Nederland, Colorado
Additional recording at the Bennett House, Franklin, TN and Quadrafonic Studio, Nashville, TN
Photography by Henry Diltz
Design by Bill Johnson
Special thanks to Fred Foster

Liner Notes
Everything becomes as crystal clear as the air in the mountains; the old man with the bronze face burning in the last sunlight against a deep blue empty sky. He says to me "If someone tells you that they ain't good enough for you, believe 'em. Like as not they know what they're talking about." He smiled, and the sunlight caught the diamond in his eye. "It ain't a tragedy" he says.
"But it's a shame."

References

1981 albums
Kris Kristofferson albums
Albums produced by Norbert Putnam
Monument Records albums